Naya Pakistan Housing & Development Authority (NAPHDA) is the national construction organization of the Government of Pakistan. NAPHDA is responsible for real estate projects' planning, development, construction and management.

Lieutenant General Anwar Ali Hyder, HI(M) (Retd.) is the chairman of NAPHDA.

History 
Naya Pakistan Housing & Development Authority was established on 15 January 2020. Senate of Pakistan passed Naya Pakistan Housing and Development Authority Bill 2019.

Subsidy 
Naya Pakistan Housing Authority has been provided a subsidy of Rs 30bn.

1,820 applications out of over 8,000 received applications have been approved with an amount of Rs 5 billion.

See also 
 Pakistan Islands Development Authority

References 

Pakistan federal departments and agencies
Housing in Pakistan
Housing organizations